Malvern is a village in northwestern Carroll County, Ohio, United States. The population was 1,110 at the 2020 census. It is part of the Canton–Massillon metropolitan area.

History
Malvern was laid out in 1834.  The village was named after Malvern Hills, in England.

Geography

Malvern lies along Ohio State Route 43.

Malvern is near the second largest privately owned man-made lake in Ohio, Lake Mohawk.

Education
Public education in the village of Malvern is provided by the Brown Local School District. Malvern has a public library, a branch of the Carroll County District Library.

Demographics

2010 census
As of the census of 2010, there were 1,189 people, 522 households, and 329 families living in the village. The racial makeup of the village was 93.8% White, 3.8% African American, 0.3% Native American, 0.3% Asian, 0.5% from other races, and 1.3% from two or more races. Hispanic or Latino of any race were 2.2% of the population.

There were 522 households, of which 26.6% had children under the age of 18 living with them, 44.1% were married couples living together, 15.1% had a female householder with no husband present, 3.8% had a male householder with no wife present, and 37.0% were non-families. 31.2% of all households were made up of individuals, and 14.9% had someone living alone who was 65 years of age or older. The average household size was 2.27 and the average family size was 2.83.

The median age in the village was 42.4 years. 20.6% of residents were under the age of 18; 8.7% were between the ages of 18 and 24; 23.3% were from 25 to 44; 29.6% were from 45 to 64; and 17.8% were 65 years of age or older. The gender makeup of the village was 48.4% male and 51.6% female.

2000 census
As of the census of 2000, there were 1,218 people, 530 households, and 332 families living in the village. The population density was 1,784.8 people per square mile (691.6/km2). There were 576 housing units at an average density of 844.1 per square mile (327.1/km2). The racial makeup of the village was 91.30% White, 6.73% African American, 0.25% Asian, 0.57% from other races, and 1.15% from two or more races. Hispanic or Latino of any race were 0.90% of the population.

There were 530 households, out of which 28.1% had children under the age of 18 living with them, 47.7% were married couples living together, 11.3% had a female householder with no husband present, and 37.2% were non-families. 33.0% of all households were made up of individuals, and 18.9% had someone living alone who was 65 years of age or older. The average household size was 2.30 and the average family size was 2.87.

In the village, the population was spread out, with 22.7% under the age of 18, 9.6% from 18 to 24, 28.1% from 25 to 44, 21.8% from 45 to 64, and 17.8% who were 65 years of age or older. The median age was 39 years. For every 100 females there were 90.0 males. For every 100 females age 18 and over, there were 78.7 males.

The median income for a household in the village was $29,063, and the median income for a family was $35,476. Males had a median income of $27,833 versus $22,188 for females. The per capita income for the village was $15,535. About 11.6% of families and 12.8% of the population were below the poverty line, including 14.9% of those under age 18 and 14.7% of those age 65 or over.

Notable people
 Don Nigro - playwright
 Ed Poole - Major League Baseball
 Theodore Newton Vail - Former president of American Telephone & Telegraph

References

Villages in Carroll County, Ohio
Villages in Ohio